The , which could be roughly translated as "long-distance lithe weapon", is a double-edged blade, with another curved blade attached near the hilt at a 45–60 degree angle. Likely used by ninja of the Iga province, it is thought to be a forerunner to the later more widely known kusarigama (sickle and chain). Ninja were often recruited from the class of rural peasantry who resided on remote farmland, and the tool's resemblance to farming equipment and high versatility in combat gave it many benefits in stealth combat.

The kyoketsu-shoge has a wide range of uses. The blade could be used for pulling slashes as well as thrusting stabs. The chain or cord, sometimes made from human hair or horsehair for strength and resiliency, could be used for climbing, ensnaring an enemy, binding an enemy and many such other uses. The long range of the weapon combined a cutting tool along with the capability to strike or entangle an enemy at what the user perceived to be a "safe" distance out of the way. When skilled with this weapon it could be used to entangle a sword and rip it from the opponents hands rendering him harmless. The kyoketsu-shoge cord and ring was sometimes used to wrap around an enemy's legs and trip them.

Typically the round ring was flat rather than round in cross section to provide a firmer grip and a more sturdy frame, as the ring was also used for strikes and deflective blows in use. This tool was also used as a climbing aid, and it could be thrown and lodged in corners.

In the cartoon show ‘’GI Joe: Renegades’’, a modified chain version was used by Jinx and Storm Shadow during “The Return of the Arashikage Parts 1 and 2”

In the film Ninja Assassin, a modified chain version of this weapon is used as Raizo's main weapon.

In the first season of Netflix series Daredevil, the blade is used with great skill by the Japanese warrior Nobu.

In the manga Spirit Circle, Fone uses this weapon to attack Stona.

References

External links

Interactive page The first Internet article written about the kyoketsu-shoge. 

Blade weapons
Chain and rope throwing weapons
Ninjutsu artefacts
Weapons of Japan